Don Riddell (born 7 September 1972) is an English news anchor and sports journalist. He is currently one of four London-based anchors of CNN's World Sport and hosts CNN's Living Golf.

Education
Riddell attended Trinity and All Saints College, then part of the University of Leeds and earned a B.A. with honours in Public Media/Communication and Cultural Studies.

Career
Edinburgh-born Riddell joined CNN in 2002. He had previously worked at the London News Network, where he worked as a sports presenter for the London Tonight programme. He started his career at Yorkshire Television in Leeds.

References

External links
Don Riddell profile

1972 births
Living people
English television journalists
English television presenters
English reporters and correspondents
Television personalities from Edinburgh
CNN people
Alumni of Leeds Trinity University